Martin Boček (born 14 December 1976) is a retired Czech football striker.

References

1976 births
Living people
Czech footballers
FK Chmel Blšany players
FK Baník Most players
FK Baník Sokolov players
FK Ústí nad Labem players
ZFC Meuselwitz players
VfB Auerbach players
Association football forwards
Czech First League players
Regionalliga players
Czech expatriate footballers
Expatriate footballers in Germany
Czech expatriate sportspeople in Germany
People from Sokolov
Sportspeople from the Karlovy Vary Region